Herman Gorter (26 November 1864, Wormerveer – 15 September 1927, Saint-Josse-ten-Noode, Brussels) was a Dutch poet and socialist. He was a leading member of the Tachtigers, a highly influential group of Dutch writers who worked together in Amsterdam in the 1880s, centered on De Nieuwe Gids (The New Guide).

Poetry 
Gorter's first book, a 4,000 verse epic poem called Mei (May), sealed his reputation as a great writer upon its publication in 1889, and is regarded as the pinnacle of Dutch Impressionist literature.

Gorter rapidly followed this up with a book of short lyric poetry simply called Verzen (Verses) in 1890, which, after initial bad reviews, was equally hailed as a masterpiece.

Initially Gorter was oriented towards the philosophy of Spinoza, whose major work Ethica he translated from Latin into Dutch (published in 1895). At the end of the century, he was drawn towards socialism, something he shared with most of the Tachtigers, and became the most politically involved of this group. Whilst continuing to write socialist poetry, he also became a major writer of socialist theory.

He was known to have had a romantic relationship with the chemist, Ada Prins (1879–1977) from 1901. She was the first Dutch woman to hold a doctorate in chemistry. According to Zwart, Whereas Ada Prins is mostly remembered as one of Gorter’s secret lovers, she was first and foremost his educated guide into the complex and enigmatic world of twentieth-century chemistry research. Liquid crystal chemistry became an important source of inspiration for Gorter’s work and the main objective of this paper is to demonstrate her influence on Gorter’s Pan as a scientific poem.His long epic poem called Pan, written in 1912, describes a great war, which was followed by a global socialist revolution. He revised it in 1915, with the new version being published in 1916.

Mei has been translated into English as May, an epic poem about youth; an extensive selection from his lyric verse has been translated as Herman Gorter: Selected Poems.  ISBN 978-90-831336-52

Politics

He joined the Social Democratic Labour Party (Sociaal-Democratische Arbeiderspartij or SDAP) in 1897. In 1909 he participated in a schism from the SDAP to form the Social-Democratic Party (Sociaal-Democratische Partij) of the Netherlands.

Correspondence with Lenin
In 1917, he hailed the Russian Revolution as the beginning of that global revolution. In June that year on medical advice he moved to Bern, Switzerland. Here he was in contact with a group of Russian revolutionary exiles who shared news of the revolution with him. Following the Bolshevik seizure of power also enabled him to send a letter to Vladimir Lenin wishing him luck and offering him help (23 December 1917). Lenin's two replies arrived in February 1918. One wished him well with his health, the second requested him to find a some socialist experts, whether in Holland or Switzerland who could help in the restructuring of the banking system and setting up a state trading company. Gorter replied that month in a letter explaining that he had such people, but also raised political concerns over the direction of the Russian Revolution: Lenin had sanctioned the granting of concessions to the peasantry as regards establishing small scale agricultural production through land reform, whereas Gorter saw Communist Revolution in Western Europe, particularly in German and England arising from the seizure of power by the industrial working class, and saw extending property rights to small peasant businesses as undermining this. He also thought that the right to national self-determination should and could only be realised in Western Europe as part of a socialist revolution. In September 1918, he wrote to Lenin again concerning the failure of the Dutch Social-Democratic Party to oppose the imperialism of America, France and Britain with the same vigour they opposed German imperialism. He implored Lenin to write something in support of this view. Lenin responded sending a copy of State and Revolution, which Gorter offered to translate. Gorter also complained that the 4 members of parliament elected by the had voted in favour of relief aid from the United States, and thus were siding with an imperialist faction.

In 1918, the Social-Democratic Party changed its name to the Communist Party of Holland (Communistische Partij Holland), and in 1919 Gorter left the party. In 1921 he was a founding member of the Communist Workers Party of Germany, joining its Essen Faction and becoming a leading supporter of the Communist Workers International.

Death
Gorter died in Brussels in 1927.

References

External links 
 
 
 
 
 Herman Gorter archive on Marxists Internet Archive
 Poems of 1890 A Selection translated by Paul Vincent

1864 births
1927 deaths
People from Zaanstad
Communist writers
Dutch communists
Dutch male poets
Social Democratic Workers' Party (Netherlands) politicians
Communist Workers' Party of Germany politicians
Marxist writers
Communist Party of the Netherlands politicians
Council communists
Communist Workers' Party of the Netherlands politicians